Gloripallium is a genus of bivalves belonging to the family Pectinidae.

The species of this genus are found in Indian and Pacific Ocean.

Species:

Gloripallium maculosum 
Gloripallium pallium 
Gloripallium speciosum 
Gloripallium spiniferum

References

Pectinidae
Bivalve genera